Norman Dinsdale (20 June 1898 – 1970) was an English professional footballer who played as a centre half. He made 426 appearances in the Football League playing for Notts County, Coventry City and Bristol Rovers, and also played non-league football for Anston Athletic, Heanor Town and Kidderminster Harriers.

References

1898 births
1970 deaths
People from Hunslet
Footballers from Yorkshire
English footballers
Association football midfielders
Kiveton Park F.C. players
Anston Athletic F.C. players
Notts County F.C. players
Coventry City F.C. players
Bristol Rovers F.C. players
Heanor Town F.C. players
Kidderminster Harriers F.C. players
English Football League players